Spectracanthicus tocantinensis is a species of catfish in the family Loricariidae. It is native to South America, where it occurs in the lower Tocantins River in the state of Pará in Brazil. The species reaches 9.3 cm (3.7 inches) SL. Its specific epithet, tocantinensis, refers to its type locality, the Tocantins.

S. tocantinensis occasionally appears in the aquarium trade, where it is typically referred to either as the spotted Maraba pleco (presumably referencing the Brazilian municipality of Marabá, located near the confluence of the Tocantins and the Itacaiúnas River) or by one of two associated L-numbers, which are L-086 and LDA-014.

References 

Fish described in 2014
Freshwater fish of Brazil
Loricariidae